The 1965 Critérium du Dauphiné Libéré was the 18th edition of a cycle race. It was from 22 May to 29 May 1965. The race started in Mâcon and then finished in Avignon. The race was won by Jacques Anquetil of the Ford France–Gitane team, Raymond Poulidor was second, and Karl-Heinz Kunde was third.

General classification

References

1965
1965 in French sport
1965 Super Prestige Pernod
May 1965 sports events in Europe